Baidya or Vaidya is a Hindu community located in Bengal. Baidyas, a caste (jāti) of Ayurvedic physicians, have long had pre-eminence in society alongside Brahmins and Kayasthas. In the colonial era, the Bhadraloks were drawn primarily, but not exclusively, from these three upper castes, who continue to maintain a collective hegemony in West Bengal.

Etymology 
The terms Baidya means a physician in the Bengali and Sanskrit languages. Bengal is the only place where they formed a caste or rather, a jati.

Origins 
The origins of Baidyas remain surrounded by a wide variety of overlapping and sometimes contradictory myths, and are heavily contested. Aside from Upapuraṇas and two genealogies(Kulajis), premodern Bengali literature does not discuss details of the caste's origins; no literature from outside the region discuss them either. The semi-legendary Ambastha connection of Baidyas who mostly held to be of a Kshatriya origin in Hindu scriptures is tenuous.

It is plausible the Baidyas had some link with Vaidyas of S. India; inscriptions of the Senas mentions migrations from Karnat and other places. The Talamanchi plates of Vikramaditya I (c. 660 CE) were drafted by one Vajravarman, described as an illustrious Vaidya. Three South Indian inscriptions of the Pandyas (c. late 8th century) note the Vaidya-kula (trans. "Vaidya clan" /"Vaidya family") to be Brahmins, famed for expertise in music and Sastras; one of them served in the dual roles of War-General and Prime Minister.

Upapuraṇas 

The Upapuranas played a significant role in the history of Bengal: they propagated and established Brahminic ideals in the hitherto-impure fringes of Aryavarta and accommodated elements of the vernacular culture to gain acceptance among masses. In the process, they became evidence of sociocultural negotiations that transpired in late-medieval Bengal.

Bṛhaddharma Puraṇa (Brh. P.; c. 13th century) was the earliest document to chronicle a hierarchy of castes in Bengal and it became the standard text for popular negotiations of caste status. It mentioned the Baidyas as a occupational caste, equivalent to the Ambasthas, deriving from a famous mythical episode where Brahmins had them ordained to be the highest of Shudras and conferred a monopoly to practice Ayurveda. In contrast, the Brahma Vaivarta Purana (Bv. P.) —notable for a very late Bengali recension (c. 14/15th c.)— treats the Baidyas as separate to Ambasthas but notes both to be Satsudras.

According to Ryosuke Furui, the Varṇasaṃkara myth and the subsequent ordaining of Saṃkaras in Brh. P. reflected and reinforced the existing social hierarchy of ancient Bengal — that is, even in pre-Brahminized Bengal, the Baidyas had an eminent position and practiced medicine — while allowing the Brahmin authors to conform an alien society to orthodoxic standards, and establish themselves at the top. Ramaprasad Chanda had supported such a reading as early as 1916. Annapurna Chattopadhyaya largely agrees and cites differences in list of mixed castes produced in Brahminical literature of different areas; he notes the sharp increase in tabulated castes at Bv. P. as correlational to increasing social complexity. Nripendra Kumar Dutt held these Upapuranas as tools for Brahmin law-makers to deprive Vaidyas of its mixed-caste privileges such as a sacred thread.

Kulajis 
Kulajis — a form of literature endemic to Bengal — were essentially genealogical registers but actually, texts in flux, reflecting contemporary society; they primarily served to establish social hierarchy vis à vis others. Out of the two extant pre-modern Baidya genealogies, Chandraprabha (CP; c. late 17th century) constructs a descent from the semi-legendary Ambasthas whereas the slightly older Sadvaidyakulapnjika (SV) did not. Further, both of them hold Adi Sura and Ballāla Sena to be among their ancestor; this is agreed upon by some Brahmin kulanjis but rejected by Kayastha ones.

History

Gupta Bengal (c. 400 C.E. - 550 C.E.) 
Sedentary agrarian societies had formed in western regions of Bengal by c. 1000 BCE.. The growth of states were roughly simultaneous with the rise of the Guptas and by then, cultural contacts with N. India was gradually flourishing. Written records predating the Guptas do not survive. 

Copper Plate Inscriptions from the Gupta Era point to a complex society with different professional classes having little socioeconomic homogeneity. Many of these classes had their own hierarchies corresponding to differential geospatial levels or economic conditions but there exists no evidence of inter-class hierarchy; rather, there were frequent collaborations at the local levels in bureaucratic affairs. It does not appear that varna played any role in the society — the Brahmins were the only group to be referred to by their caste-identity and were revered but still classed as one among the peasant landholder class.

One Gunaighar Inscription, dated to Vainyagupta (507 C.E.), demarcated agricultural tracts that were to be collectively owned by Baidyas. In tune with the understanding of Bengal under the Guptas, the reference was, in all likelihood, to the profession of physicians who probably drew people from various varnas including Brahmins.

Medieval Bengal (c. 600 C.E. - c. 1400 C.E.) 
With the rise of sovereign kingships centered around Vanga, Radha, and Pundravardhana, the relatively well-off sections among the landholder class gained eminence and got split into several sub-classes depending on economic power. Inscriptions referred to people from these classes alongside the villages they owned and above other professional classes — thus, economic affluence, rather than varna, appears to have been the operating norm in these societies. North-eastern Bengal which saw aggressive encroachment upon tribal tracts via royal settlement of Brahmins witnessed a less egalitarian society; yet, notwithstanding rulers claiming to a Brahmin pedigree etc, the social groups in inscriptions did not have anything to do with varna. 

With increasing urbanization in Pala territories, stratification became engrained into the social structure and Brahmins —probably with state patronage— ascended to the top, overshadowing the landed magnates. Pala grants frequently enlist a detailed social hierarchy from the Brahmins to the Chandalas, encompassing many professional classes. In contrast, largely-agrarian societies in the east, ruled by the Chandras, exhibited no such radical developments though rudimentary notions of ranks were under development. The Paschimbhag copperplate inscription of Sri Chandra allotted the Baidyas with the largest share of land per se —even exceeding the Brahmins— pointing to the yet-insignificant roles played by varna.

Beginning the 11th century, kinship based organization was increasingly evident across all classes — sects of Brahmins claimed greater authority deriving from the illustriousness of their ancestors and networked among themselves, literate classes entered into practicing endogamy etc. Inscriptions increasingly point to the hereditary nature of a range of professions from merchants to engravers to scribes. In the words of Furui, proto-jatis were forming across these spans which would be legitimized into a Brahminic social order by the Upapuranas etc. The Bhatera Copper Plates mention the aksapaṭalika of King Isandeva (c. 1050) to be of Baidya lineage, on whose advice a parcel of land was granted to the family of a dead prince. Kumkum Chatterjee feels that the Baidyas had probably crystallized into a jati long before the Sultanate rule, sometime around these times.

Sultanate and Mughal Bengal 
In Sultanate, Mughal, and Nawabi Bengal, Baidyas often branched out into fields other than medicine and composed a significant percentage of the elites. They were reputed for their proficiency in Sanskrit, which they needed to read treatises of medicine. By the end of sixteenth century, Baidyas were occupying a position of preeminence in the Bengali social hierarchy alongside Brahmins and Kayasthas; marriages between Baidyas and Kayasthas were commonplace.

Around the late fifteenth century, Baidyas became intricately associated with the Caitanya Cult alongside Brahmins. Murari Gupta, a childhood friend of Caitanya, was a famed physician of Navadwip and went on to compose Krsna Caitanya Caritamrta, his oldest extant biography in Sanskrit. Narahari Sarkara, another Baidya devotees, composed Krsna Bhajanamrta, a theological commentary. Sivananda Sena, an immensely wealthy Baidya, organize the annual trip of Caitanya devotees to Puri, and his son wrote several devotional Sanskrit works. As the Caitanya cult shunned doctrines of equality after his death, the associated Baidyas began enjoying a quasi-Brahminic status as Gaudiya Vasihnava gurus.

Multiple Baidya authors partook in the Mangalkavya tradition, the foremost being Bijaya Gupta (late 15th c.). Besides, two Chandi Mangalkavyas were penned by Jaynnarayana Sen (c. 1750) and Muktarama Sen (1774), two Manasa Mangalkavyas by Sasthibara Datta (late 17th c.) and one by Dbarik Das. Bharatamallika (fl. 1650), a physician and an instructor of a tol, wrote numerous commentaries on Sanskrit texts like Amarakosha, and produced miscellaneous works on grammar and lexicography.

Caste status and contestations 
The Vallal Charita of Ānanda Bhaṭṭa classed the Baidyas among Satsudras, of whom Kayasthas were held to be the highest. The Chandimangal of Mukundaram Chakrabarti (c. mid 16th century CE) placed the Baidyas below Vaisyas but above Kayasthas, again indicating a Sudra status. Works by Raghunandana (c. mid 16th century) also hold Baidyas to be Sudras. In 1653 C.E., Ramakanta Das wrote the oldest available Baidya kulanji — Sadvaidyakulapnjika. A few years later, Bharatamallika would write Chandraprabha (1675 C.E.), and Ratnaprabha, a summary of the former text. Bharata claimed a mixed-caste/Vaishya status for the Baidyas whereas Das skipped such discussions. In the Caitanya Caritāmṛta of Baidya Krishnadasa Kaviraja, one Candrasekhara is variably referred to as a Baidya and a Sudra.

Colonial Bengal 
During the eighteenth, nineteenth, and twentieth centuries, acrimonious debates about the caste status of Baidyas prolifered. Around 1750, Raja Ballabh wished to have Brahmins officiate at his rituals; he sought Vaishya status and claimed a right of wearing sacred thread for the Baidyas of his own samaj. On facing opposition from other Baidya zamindars, who thought this to be an attempt at gaining trans-samaj acceptance as a Baidya leader, and Brahmin scholars of Vikrampur, who resented against the loss of monopoly, Ballabh invited 131 Brahmins from Benaras, Kanauj, Navadwip, and other regions with expertise in Nyaya Shastra. All of them adjudicated in his favour, with ceremonial costs running to 5 Lakhs. 

Soon, Baidyas sought for equality with the Brahmins and claimed themselves to be "Gauna (secondary) Brahmins", leveraging the recently conferred right to upanayana. At the same time, they invested efforts to prevent lower rank caste from infiltrating into their ranks and emphasize on their social purity; in the smallpox epidemic of 1840s in Dhaka, Baidyas would refuse to inoculate the masses and relegate such menial tasks to lower-ranked barbers and garland makers. Beginning in 1822, Brahmin and Baidya scholars produced a series of polemical pamphlets against one another and in 1831, the Baidya Samaj (Baidya Society) was formed by Khudiram Bisharad, a teacher at the Native Medical Institution, to defend class interests. Gangadhar Ray, a member of this society, produced voluminous literature to put forward partisan claims on Baidyas descending from Brahmins. Binodlal Sen later published Bharatamallika's genealogies in print. A rivalry with the Kayasthas, who would be considered to be inferior thenceforth, became an integral part of this discourse; matrimonial alliances were discouraged, fomenting the rise of a rigid, endogamous caste group.

In 1893, Jnanendramohan Sengupta wrote Baidyajatir Baisista in an attempt to prove the Ambasthas had scriptural sanction of being ordained into sannyasa, like Brahmins; Sengupta would remain a prolific author for the Baidya cause throughout the first quarter of the twentieth century. In 1901, colonial ethnographer Herbert Hope Risley noted the Baidyas to be above Sudras but below Brahmins. Baidya social historians like Umesh Chandra Gupta and Dinesh Chandra Sen supported Risley's observation of non-Shudra status with measured skepticism and went on to produce illustrious histories of the community, deriving from kulanjis. In the early twentieth century, Gananath Sen, the first dean of the Faculty of Ayurveda at Banaras Hindu University, opened a "Baidya Brahman Samiti" in Kolkata; now, the Baidyas were not merely equal to Brahmins but identical. It was also suggested all Baidyas change their surnames to Sharma, a Brahmin patronymic. In 1915 and 1916, Kuladakinkara Ray published Vaidyakulapanjika to advocate that Baidyas were not just the same as Brahmins but the highest of them. In 1922, Basantakumar Sen wrote Baidya Jatir Itihas on the same themes. Pascale Haag notes these efforts to gain mobility would not have partly succeeded without acceptance by Brahmin society, whose responses remain to be studied.

These attempts at attaining mobility were heavily enmeshed with the modernization of Ayurveda, that transpired across the nineneeth century. Binodlal Sen had declared the genealogical works to be free for anyone who purchased medications above a certain value and Baidya medicine distributors were frequently found to sell revisionist caste histories. Says Mukharji, that elements of colonial modernity—Western notions of physiology and medical instruments—were "braided" with Ayurveda to fashion Baidyas as the modern Brahmins. Notwithstanding these contestations of scriptural rank, the material dominance of Baidyas continued unabated into colonial rule when they proactively took to Western forms of education and held a disproportionate share of government jobs, elite professions, and landholding. Male as well as female literacy rate of Baidyas were remarkably higher than in the case of all other castes of Bengal, as recorded in the 1881 census—which was the first to record caste-wise literacy data—and ever since. Baidya women, specifically, had two and three times the literacy( in vernacular and English respectively) of Bengal's overall male population as per the 1931 census.  

Baidyas were unquestionably established as among the "upper castes" by the mid-nineteenth century; they would go on to compose the Bhadralok Samaj—the highest "secular rank" in contemporary Bengal—along with Brahmins and Kayasthas, and serve as the eyes and ears of the British Government. The Bhadraloks would be instrumental in demanding democratic reforms during the early twentieth century; a majority of "revolutionary terrorists" from Bengal who partook in the Indian independence movement came from this class.

Modern Bengal 

In modern Bengal, Baidyas' place in caste-hierarchy follows Brahmins — they wear the sacred thread, have access to scriptures, and use common surnames but cannot conduct priestly services. Their ritual rank — whether Sudras or not — is debated and claims to Brahmin status persist. However, their socioeconomic status rivals that of Brahmins. As of 1960, inter-marriages between the Brahmins, Baidyas and Kayasthas were common and increasing. 

Baidyas wield considerable socio-economic power in contemporary Bengal as part of Bhadraloks; though in absence of rigorous data, the precise extent is difficult to determine. Parimal Ghosh notes this Bhadralok hegemony to have effectively disenfranchised the rest of Bengal from staking a claim to social capital.

Notable people 
 Amartya Sen, economist and philosopher; recipient of Nobel Memorial Prize in Economic Sciences and Bharat Ratna
 Chittaranjan Das, Indian revolutionary and lawyer, popularly known as Deshbandhu, 
 Dinesh Chandra Sen, Bengali writer, educationist 
 Hiralal Sen, one of India's first film makers
 Jatindra Mohan Sengupta, Indian revolutionary
 Jatindranath Sengupta, Bengali poet and writer
 Jibanananda Das. poet, writer and novelist
 Keshub Chandra Sen, philosopher, social reformer
 Madhusudan Gupta, India's first human dissector 
 Mrinal Sen, Dadasaheb Phalke winner Indian film director
 Nabinchandra Sen, Poet
 Prafulla Chandra Sen, 3rd CM of West Bengal
 Pritilata Waddedar, revolutionary nationalist
 Ramkamal Sen, former principal of Calcutta Sanskrit College
 Ramprasad Sen, Hindu Shakta poet and saint
 R. C. Majumdar, historian
 Siddhartha Shankar Ray, 5th Chief Minister  of West Bengal
 Suchitra Sen, Bengali actress
 Surya Sen, Indian revolutionary, popularly known as Master Da
 Surendranath Dasgupta, Indian scholar of Sanskrit and Indian philosophy

See also
Vaidya

Notes

References

Social groups of West Bengal
Bengali Hindu castes